A demi-sonnet is a poetic form. Demi-sonnets include seven lines of varying length and tend to be aphoristic in nature. Each poem ends with an internal full or slant rhyme.

Etymology 
The name comes from the fact that the form is half the length of a traditional 14-line sonnet.

References 

Scythe Literary Journal
Best of the Net Anthology
Kestrel

External links
Word Problems by Erin Murphy
 Demi-sonnet in Best of the Net anthology: http://www.sundresspublications.com/bestof/2009/murphye.htm
 4 demi-sonnets in the Spring 2010 issue of Scythe Literary Journal: http://scytheliteraryjournal.com/
 3 demi-sonnets in Kestrel (under Erin Murphy) http://www.fairmontstate.edu/kestrel/issue-24-spring-2010
 Demi-sonnet in Tattoo Highway

Poetic forms